Ivan Mykolayovych Banzeruk (born 9 February 1990) is a Ukrainian racewalker. He competed in the 50 kilometres walk event at the 2013 World Championships in Athletics. He also competed in the 50 kilometres walk event at the 2015 World Championships in Athletics in Beijing, China, where he finished in 15th place. In 2019, he competed in the men's 50 kilometres walk at the 2019 World Athletics Championships held in Doha, Qatar. He did not finish his race.

See also
 Ukraine at the 2015 World Championships in Athletics

References

Ukrainian male racewalkers
Living people
Place of birth missing (living people)
1990 births
World Athletics Championships athletes for Ukraine
Athletes (track and field) at the 2016 Summer Olympics
Olympic athletes of Ukraine
Universiade medalists in athletics (track and field)
Universiade gold medalists for Ukraine
Medalists at the 2015 Summer Universiade
Sportspeople from Volyn Oblast
Athletes (track and field) at the 2020 Summer Olympics